Chash may refer to:

In computing
C Sharp (programming language)
cHash, a hash value

Places
Tashkent, the capital of Uzbekistan, which was known as "Chach" in medieval times

See also
Cash (disambiguation)